Luke James Tittensor (born 3 November 1989) is an English actor best known for his role as Carl Gallagher in Shameless (a role he shared with his twin brother, Elliott Tittensor) and his role as Daz Eden in Emmerdale.

Career
Tittensor and his twin brother, Elliott, appeared in the soap Brookside. In the first season of Channel 4 series Shameless, the Tittensor twins shared the role of Carl Gallagher. Elliott continued playing the role of Carl after Luke left the show.

Tittensor took the role of Daz Eden in Emmerdale, first appearing in 2003. He continued to act in Emmerdale until April 2009, when his contract was terminated due to a criminal conviction. In 2010, Tittensor played gay pupil Connor in Waterloo Road. He appeared in an episode of Casualty in January 2011 and played the part of Nathan in episode one of the BBC drama series The Body Farm in September 2011.

In 2012, Tittensor played the character of Liam in Holby City. Tittensor appeared in Our World War as Paddy Kennedy in 2014. Also in 2014, he played Hippolyte in the film Madame Bovary. Tittensor starred in an episode of Moving On in March 2014.

Tittensor currently stars as Ser Arryk Cargyll in HBO's House of the Dragon alongside his twin brother who plays the role of Ser Erryk Cargyll.

Personal life
Luke Tittensor is the identical twin brother of Elliott Tittensor.

On 23 March 2009, Tittensor pleaded guilty to a charge of grievous bodily harm against an unnamed 16-year-old in Rochdale on 15 February 2008 that left the victim with a fractured jaw. His Emmerdale contract was terminated in April 2009 due to his conviction, with his last appearance in the show occurring the same month. On 29 April 2009, Tittensor received a nine-month suspended jail sentence for the assault. He was also ordered to complete 200 hours' unpaid work and pay £1,000 compensation to the victim.

References

External links
 

1989 births
British identical twins
English male child actors
English criminals
English male soap opera actors
Identical twin male actors
Living people
People from Heywood, Greater Manchester
English twins
Male actors from Manchester
English male film actors
English male television actors
21st-century English male actors